Portland East is a parliamentary constituency represented in the House of Representatives of the Jamaican Parliament. It elects one Member of Parliament MP by the first past the post system of election.

It is represented by Labour MP Ann-Marie Vaz. Vaz's husband Daryl Vaz is MP for Portland Western.

Members 

 Donald Rhodd (2007 to 2011)
 Lynvale Bloomfield (2011 to 2019)
 Ann-Marie Vaz (2019 to present)

Boundaries 

Encompasses the Portland communities of Fellowship, Port Antonio and Fairy Hill.

References

Parliamentary constituencies of Jamaica